Richard Bissell may refer to:
Richard M. Bissell Jr. (1909–1994), American CIA officer 
Richard Pike Bissell (1913–1977), American author and playwright

See also
Richard Bessel, British historian